Gerhard Neuser (29 October 1938 – 7 August 1993) was a German footballer. He made 143 appearances in the Bundesliga for Schalke 04.

References

External links 
 

1938 births
1993 deaths
German footballers
Association football midfielders
Bundesliga players
FC Schalke 04 players
Sportfreunde Siegen players